Corna Imagna is a comune (municipality) in the Province of Bergamo in the Italian region of Lombardy, located about  northeast of Milan and about  northwest of Bergamo.

Corna Imagna borders the following municipalities: Blello, Brembilla, Fuipiano Valle Imagna, Gerosa, Locatello, Rota d'Imagna, Sant'Omobono Imagna.

Demographic evolution

References